The Cooma Mail was an Australian passenger train that operated from May 1889 until May 1986 between Sydney and Cooma.

History
The Cooma Mail commenced operating following the opening of the line from Michelago to Cooma in May 1889. The service ran overnight departing Sydney at 21:00 arriving in Cooma at 10:30 the following morning.

In 1912, the service was upgraded to run as a passenger train throughout, it had previously operated as a mixed train south of Queanbeyan, and accelerated departing Sydney at 20:25 and arriving at 07:00. In March 1927 a Canberra portion was added.

In June 1981, the Sydney bound services was altered to operate as a daylight service departing Cooma at 08:50. On 31 May 1986 the Cooma Mail was withdrawn.

References

Named passenger trains of New South Wales
Night trains of Australia
Passenger rail transport in New South Wales
Railway services introduced in 1889
Railway services discontinued in 1986
Transport in the Australian Capital Territory
1889 establishments in Australia
1986 disestablishments in Australia
Cooma
Discontinued railway services in Australia